Bertoli is a surname of Italian origin, an abbreviated version of Bartolomeo. It may refer to:

Alberto Bertoli, Italian singer, son of Pierangelo
Dante Bertoli (1913-1996), Italian wrestler
Fabio Bertoli (born 1996), Italian footballer
Franco Bertoli (born 1959), Italian former volleyball player
Gianfranco Bertoli, Italian anarchist
Giovanni Antonio Bertoli (fl. 1645), Italian composer of the early baroque
Jack Vicajee Bertoli (born 1931), Indian planner and architect, naturalised as a Swiss citizen
Mauro Bertoli, Italian guitarist
Paolo Bertoli (1908-2001), Italian Catholic cardinal
Pierangelo Bertoli (1942-2002), Italian singer-songwriter
Sara Bertoli (born 1979), Italian modern pentathlete
Scott Bertoli (born 1977), Canadian ice hockey player
Sebastián Bertoli (born 1977), Argentine footballer
Zeno Bertoli, Italian water polo player for C.N. Posillipo and the Italy men's national water polo team

See also
Bertolí, Spanish footballer (Inocencio Bertolín Izquierdo)
 Bertol (surname)
 Bertolli (disambiguation)
 Bertolo
 Bertolini
 Bertoloni

Italian-language surnames